Kent M. Williams (born September 15, 1960) is a Democratic member of the South Carolina Senate, representing the 30th District since 2004.

External links
 South Carolina Legislature - Senator Kent M. Williams – official SC Senate website
 Project Vote Smart - Senator Kent M. Williams (SC) profile
 Follow the Money – Kent M. Williams
 2006 2004 campaign contributions
 

Democratic Party South Carolina state senators
1960 births
Living people
21st-century American politicians
People from Marion, South Carolina